Nicolai Philipsen (14 July 1880 – 3 March 1949) was a Danish gymnast. He competed in the men's team event at the 1908 Summer Olympics.

References

1880 births
1949 deaths
Danish male artistic gymnasts
Olympic gymnasts of Denmark
Gymnasts at the 1908 Summer Olympics
Sportspeople from Copenhagen